The 1918 Ole Miss Rebels football team represented the University of Mississippi during the 1918 college football season. The season is the only with two Egg Bowl losses.

Schedule

References

Mississippi
Ole Miss Rebels football seasons
Ole Miss Rebels football